Georgios Georgiou (Greek: Γιώργος Γεωργίου; born 24 September 1979) is a Greek footballer who currently plays for A.E. Kifisia F.C. in the Football League 2 as a centre back.

Career
Born in Augsburg, Germany, Georgiou moved to Greece where he played football for Lamia F.C.

Georgiou could not score in 58 games for Atromitos, but scored in his official OFI debut against Atromitos.

References

External links
 Georgios Georgiou at anorthosisfc.com
Profile at EPAE.org
Profile at Onsports.gr

1979 births
Living people
Greek footballers
Greek expatriate footballers
Sportspeople from Augsburg
Panetolikos F.C. players
A.O. Kerkyra players
Atromitos F.C. players
OFI Crete F.C. players
Expatriate footballers in Cyprus
Association football central defenders
Footballers from Bavaria